Black Is Beautiful is a studio album by Dean Blunt and Inga Copeland of the electronic duo Hype Williams, released in 2012 on Hyperdub.

Critical reception

The album received positive reviews, and was ranked the second-best album of the 2010s decade by Tiny Mix Tapes.

Track listing

References

2012 albums